Japan participated and hosted the 1986 Asian Winter Games held in Sapporo, Hokkaidō, Japan from March 1 to March 8, 1986. The country sent a total of 92 athletes to the games, 61 men and 31 women. Japan garnered 29 gold medals securing its top spot in the medal tally.

Participation details

Medal table
This table is incomplete. You can help by expanding it.

References

Nations at the 1986 Asian Winter Games
Asian Winter Games
Japan at the Asian Winter Games